Ivan Ginov (born 10 February 1956) is a Bulgarian wrestler. He competed in the men's freestyle 90 kg at the 1980 Summer Olympics.

References

1956 births
Living people
Bulgarian male sport wrestlers
Olympic wrestlers of Bulgaria
Wrestlers at the 1980 Summer Olympics
Sportspeople from Burgas